Conaway Run Lake Wildlife Management Area is located on  in Tyler County near Middlebourne, West Virginia. Mixed hardwoods forests and brush cover much of the hillsides surrounding the 30-acre (12 ha) Conaway Run Lake.

Hunting, fishing and trapping

Hunting opportunities include deer, grouse, squirrel and turkey. Conaway Run Lake provides fishing opportunities for largemouth bass, bluegill and channel catfish, as well as stocked trout. The lake is equipped with two small boat ramps and a handicapped fishing pier. Trappers have the opportunity to pursue beaver, muskrat, raccoon, mink or fox.

A shooting range is available for gun enthusiasts.  Rustic camping sites are available (for a small fee) for tents and small trailers.

See also

Animal conservation
Animal trapping
Fishing
Hunting
List of West Virginia wildlife management areas

References

External links
 West Virginia DNR District 6 Wildlife Management Areas
West Virginia Hunting Regulations
West Virginia Fishing Regulations
WVDNR map of Conaway Run Lake Wildlife Management Area

Campgrounds in West Virginia
Protected areas of Tyler County, West Virginia
Wildlife management areas of West Virginia
IUCN Category V